FK Náchod is a football club located in Náchod, Czech Republic. The club is most notable for playing in its country's top division, the Czechoslovak First League, in the 1930s. It currently plays in Divize C, which is in the fourth tier of the Czech football system.

In 2001–2011 the club played under the name FK Náchod-Deštné. In 2011 it was divided into two clubs.

Historical names 
 1902 — SK Náchod
 1947 — DSO Sokol Tepna Náchod-Plhov
 1948 — DSO Sokol Rubena Náchod merger with SK Kudrnáč Náchod
 1961 — TJ Jiskra Náchod
 1963 — TJ Jiskra Tepna Náchod
 1964 — TJ Tepna Náchod
 1974 — TJ Náchod
 1994 — SK SOMOS Náchod
 2001 — FK Náchod-Deštné merger with TJ Sokol Deštné v Orl. horách
 2011 — FK Náchod

References

External links
 Official website 

 
Football clubs in the Czech Republic
Association football clubs established in 1902
Czechoslovak First League clubs